Spirit houses are above-ground structures used by some of the Carrier people of Northern British Columbia (for example, Nazko) for burial rites and rituals. The Spirit Houses contain artifacts family and clan members have deposited for their loved one's life on the other side and they are used to be unknown and have bad spirits in them.

Death customs
Dakelh